Ursula of Brandenburg (25 September 1450 – 25 November 1508, Breslau) was a princess of Brandenburg by birth and by marriage Duchess of Münsterberg and Oels and Countess of Glatz.

Life 
Ursula was the eldest child of the Elector Albrecht Achilles of Brandenburg (1414–1486) from his first marriage to Margarete of Baden (1431–1457).  The princess was considered a favorite child of her father and one of the most prominent victims of the marriage of convenience in the 15th century.  First, she had been promised to Duke Albert the Brave of Saxony.  When he broke off the engagement, she was passed on to his older brother, Ernest.  When this engagement was also dissolved, the next marriage candidate was Duke Henry the Elder of Münsterberg-Oels (1448–1498), son of the Bohemian king George of Poděbrady.  In 1466 Pope Paul II disapproved of the engagement as a "blasphemous connection with a heretic", and Ursula and her father were excommunicated.  The relations between Brandenburg and Emperor Frederick III also worsened due to the engagement. George of Poděbrady and Abrecht Achilles created a defensive alliance against all the opponents of the marriage.

Without telling her father, Ursula secretly became engaged to Count Rudolph III of Sulz, Landgrave in Klettgau. The pope dissolved this engagement, and she eventually married in Cheb, on 9 February 1467, Duke Henry the Elder of Münsterberg. The ban imposed on Ursula and her father was lifted in 1471.

Issue 
From her marriage to Henry of Münsterberg, Ursula had the following children:
 Albert (3 August 1468 – 12 July 1511), Duke of Münsterberg-Oels
 married in 1487 Princess Salome (1475/76-1514), daughter of Duke John II of Żagań and Großglogau
 George (2 October 1470 – 10 November 1502), Duke of Münsterberg-Oels
 married in 1488 Princess Jadwiga (1476–1524), also a daughter of John II of Żagań
 John (23 June 1472 – 7 August 1472)
 Margaret (25 August 1473 –  28 June 1530)
 married in 1494 Prince Ernest of Anhalt-Dessau
 Charles (2/4 May 1476 – 31 May 1536)
 married in 1488 Princess Anna (1480/83-1541), also a daughter of John II of Żagań
 Louis (21 June 1479 – 27 April 1480)
 Magdalena (25 January 1482 – 11 April 1513)
 Sidonie (3 June 1483 – 1522), married in 1515 Ulrich of Hardegg

References 
 Karl Friedrich Pauli: Allgemeine preussissche Staats-Geschichte, bis auf gegenwärtige Regierung, vol 1, 1761, p. 369
 Samuel Buchholtz: Versuch einer Geschichte der Churmarck Brandenburg, F. W. Birnstiel, 1767, p. 216
 Heidelberger Jahrbücher der Literatur, vol. 55, Mohr und Zimmer, 1862, p. 820 (Digitized)
 GenaNet

Footnotes 

House of Hohenzollern
1450 births
1508 deaths
Medieval Bohemian nobility
German duchesses
Podiebrad family
15th-century Bohemian people
16th-century Bohemian people
15th-century Bohemian women
16th-century Bohemian women
Daughters of monarchs